Rashid K. Shabazz (born William E. Dinwiddie; July 15, 1943) is an American retired professional basketball player who played in the National Basketball Association (NBA). He started the 1966–67 season playing for the Columbus Comets of the North American Basketball League (NABL). Dinwiddie then signed as a free agent with the Cincinnati Royals in 1966 and began playing with the team in 1967. In 1969, he was traded to the Boston Celtics for Bob Cousy. He was later traded to the Milwaukee Bucks for a sixth-round draft pick.

NBA career statistics

Regular season

|-
| align="left" | 1967–68
| align="left" | Cincinnati
| 67 || - || 13.0 || .394 || - || .608 || 3.5 || 0.5 || - || - || 5.1
|-
| align="left" | 1968–69
| align="left" | Cincinnati
| 69 || - || 14.9 || .352 || - || .517 || 3.5 || 0.8 || - || - || 4.2
|-
| align="left" | 1970–71
| align="left" | Boston
| 61 || - || 11.8 || .375 || - || .730 || 3.4 || 0.6 || - || - || 4.9
|-
| align="left" | 1971–72
| align="left" | Milwaukee
| 23 || - || 6.3 || .281 || - || .556 || 1.4 || 0.4 || - || - || 1.6
|- class="sortbottom"
| style="text-align:center;" colspan="2"| Career
| 220 || - || 12.5 || .369 || - || .610 || 3.3 || 0.6 || - || - || 4.4
|}

References

1943 births
Living people
American men's basketball players
Boston Celtics players
Cincinnati Royals players
Forwards (basketball)
Milwaukee Bucks players
New Mexico Highlands Cowboys basketball players
Sportspeople from Muncie, Indiana
Undrafted National Basketball Association players